Supriya Routray (born 12 June 1990) is an Indian footballer who plays as a midfielder for the India women's national football team. She was part of the team at the 2012 SAFF Women's Championship and 2015–16 AFC Women's Olympic Qualifying Tournament. She played for Gokulam Kerala FC in Indian Women's League.

Honours

India
 SAFF Women's Championship: 2010, 2012, 2014
 South Asian Games Gold medal: 2016

Rising Students Club
Indian Women's League: 2017–18

Gokulam Kerala
Indian Women's League: 2019–20

Odisha
 Senior Women's National Football Championship: 2010–11
 National Games Silver medal: 2022

Railways
 Senior Women's National Football Championship: 2015–16

References

1990 births
Living people
People from Cuttack
Footballers from Odisha
Women's association football midfielders
India women's international footballers
Sportswomen from Odisha
Indian women's footballers
Gokulam Kerala FC Women players
Indian Women's League players
South Asian Games gold medalists for India
South Asian Games medalists in football
21st-century Indian women